Clyde Telesford (born 12 July 1974) is a Grenadian cricketer. He played in one first-class match for the Windward Islands in 2001/02 and four Twenty20 matches for Grenada in 2006 and 2008.

See also
 List of Windward Islands first-class cricketers

References

External links
 

1974 births
Living people
Grenadian cricketers
Windward Islands cricketers